Luis Hernández Kerlegand (born 18 November 1993 in Tlalnepantla de Baz) is a Mexican professional footballer who last played for Athletic Morelos.

External links
 

1993 births
Living people
Club Atlético Zacatepec players
Liga MX players
Ascenso MX players
Liga Premier de México players
Tercera División de México players
Footballers from the State of Mexico
People from Tlalnepantla de Baz
Association footballers not categorized by position
Mexican footballers